Mahamudnagar Union is a union of Tangail Sadar Upazila, Tangail District, Bangladesh.

Demographics
According to the 2011 Bangladesh census, Mahamudnagar Union had 4,175 households and a population of 19,157. The literacy rate (age 7 and over) was 36% (male: 40.1%, female: 32%).

See also
 Union Councils of Tangail District

References

Populated places in Tangail District
Unions of Tangail Sadar Upazila